is a passenger railway station in located in the city of Yokosuka, Kanagawa, Japan, operated by East Japan Railway Company (JR East).

Lines
Yokosuka Station is served by the Yokosuka Line. It is located 15.9 km from Ōfuna Station, and 65.3 km from the Tokyo Station.

Station layout
The station consists of a bay platform and a side platform serving three tracks. Platform 1, formerly used for freight operations, is currently not in use. Platform 2 is used for trains which originate or terminate at Yokosuka, and Platform 3 is for bi-directional traffic. The station has a Midori no Madoguchi staffed ticket office.

Platforms

History
Yokosuka Station opened on June 16, 1889 as the initial terminal station on the Japanese Government Railways (JGR) spur line from Ōfuna to serve the Yokosuka Naval Arsenal and related Imperial Japanese Navy facilities at Yokosuka. This spur line was renamed the Yokosuka Line on October 12, 1909. The present station building, the third building on this site was completed in April, 1940 and the line extended past Yokosuka to Kurihama Station in 1944. Freight operations were discontinued from February 1, 1984. The station came under the management of JR East upon the privatization of the Japanese National Railways (JNR) on April 1, 1987.

Station layout
Yokosuka station consists of bay platforms and a side platform serving three tracks. Track 1, formerly used for freight operations, is currently not in use. Track 2 is used for trains which originate or terminate at Yokosuka, and Track 3 is for bi-directional traffic.

Passenger statistics
In fiscal 2019, the station was used by an average of 4,845 passengers daily (boarding passengers only).

The passenger figures (boarding passengers only) for previous years are as shown below.

Surrounding area
Verny Park
United States Fleet Activities Yokosuka
Yokosuka Arts Theatre
Midorigaoka Girls' Junior and Senior High School

See also
List of railway stations in Japan

References

External links

 JR East Station information (JR East) 

Railway stations in Kanagawa Prefecture
Railway stations in Japan opened in 1889
Yokosuka Line
Railway stations in Yokosuka, Kanagawa